1656 Suomi is a binary Hungaria asteroid and sizable Mars-crosser from the innermost regions of the asteroid belt. It was discovered on 11 March 1942, by Finnish astronomer Yrjö Väisälä at Turku Observatory in Southwest Finland, who named it "Suomi", the native name of Finland. The stony asteroid has a short rotation period of 2.6 hours and measures approximately 7.9 kilometers in diameter. In June 2020, a companion was discovered by Brian Warner, Robert Stephens and Alan Harris. The satellite measures more than 1.98 kilometers in diameter, about 26% of the primary, which it orbits once every 57.9 hours at an average distance of 30 kilometers.

Orbit and classification 

Suomi is a member of the Hungaria family, which form the innermost dense concentration of asteroids in the Solar System. It orbits the Sun at a distance of 1.6–2.1 AU once every 2 years and 7 months (940 days). Its orbit has an eccentricity of 0.12 and an inclination of 25° with respect to the ecliptic.

It is also classified as a Mars-crossing asteroid, since its perihelion – the point in its orbit, where it is nearest to the Sun – is less than the average orbital distance of the planet Mars (1.666 AU). Suomis observation arc begins on the preceding night of its discovery, with an observation taken at Johannesburg Observatory on 10 March 1942.

Naming 

As with 1453 Fennia, this minor planet was named after Finland. The official  was published by the Minor Planet Center on 20 February 1976.

Physical characteristics 

In the Tholen taxonomy, Suomi is a stony S-type asteroid.

Diameter and albedo 

According to the survey carried out by the Infrared Astronomical Satellite IRAS, Suomi measures 7.86 kilometers in diameter and its surface has an albedo of 0.156, making it one of the largest Mars crossing asteroid with a known diameter. The Collaborative Asteroid Lightcurve Link (CALL) agrees with IRAS, and adopts an albedo of 0.157 and a diameter of 7.9 kilometers with an absolute magnitude of 13.146.

Rotation period 

Since 1991, a large number of rotational lightcurves of Suomi have been obtained from photometric observations (also see infobox). CALL adopts a rotation period of 2.583 hours with a brightness variation of 0.20 magnitude.

References

External links 
 Turun Ursa, (in Finnish)
 Photometric Observations of 125 Asteroids, Wisniewski, Icarus, Volume 126, Issue 2, pp. 395–449.
 Lightcurve plot of 1656 Suomi, Palmer Divide Observatory, B. D. Warner (2009)
 Asteroid Lightcurve Database (LCDB), query form (info )
 Dictionary of Minor Planet Names, Google books
 Asteroids and comets rotation curves, CdR – Observatoire de Genève, Raoul Behrend
 Discovery Circumstances: Numbered Minor Planets (1)-(5000) – Minor Planet Center
 
 

001656
001656
Discoveries by Yrjö Väisälä
Named minor planets
001656
001656
19420311